The Uzbek Soviet Socialist Republic, also known as Soviet Uzbekistan, the Uzbek SSR, UzSSR, UzbSSR, or simply Uzbekistan and rarely Uzbekia, was a union republic of the Soviet Union. It was governed by the Uzbek branch of the Soviet Communist Party, the legal political party, from 1925 until 1990. From 1990 to 1991, it was a sovereign part of the Soviet Union with its own legislation.

Beginning 20 June 1990, the Uzbek SSR adopted the Declaration of State Sovereignty within its borders. Islam Karimov became the republic's inaugural president.

On 31 August 1991, the Uzbek SSR was renamed the Republic of Uzbekistan and declared independence three months before the Soviet Union's dissolution on 26 December 1991.

Uzbekistan was bordered by Kazakhstan to the north; Tajikistan to the southeast; Kirghizia to the northeast; Afghanistan to the south; and Turkmenistan to the southwest.

Name 
The name, Uzbekistan, literally means "Home of the Free", taken from an amalgamation of uz (Turkic: "self"), bek (Turkic: "master"), and -stan (Persian: "land of"). However, the official name of the republic was the Uzbek Soviet Socialist Republic as defined by its 1937 and 1978 Constitutions.

History 

In 1924, the borders of political units in Central Asia were changed along ethnic lines determined by Vladimir Lenin's Commissar for Nationalities, Joseph Stalin. The Turkestan ASSR, the Bukharan People's Soviet Republic, and the Khorezm People's Soviet Republic were abolished and their territories were divided into eventually five separate Soviet Socialist Republics, one of which was the Uzbek Socialist Soviet Republic, created on 27 October 1924. The next year Uzbekistan became one of the republics of the Union of Soviet Socialist Republics (Soviet Union). In 1928, the collectivization of land into state farms was initiated, which lasted until the late 1930s.

Uzbekistan included the Tajik ASSR until 1929, when the Tajik ASSR was upgraded to an equal status. In 1930, the Uzbek SSR capital was relocated from Samarkand to Tashkent, which remained the capital since. In 1936, Uzbekistan was enlarged with the addition of the Karakalpak ASSR taken from the Kazakh SSR in the last stages of the national delimitation in the Soviet Union. That same year in December, it was renamed to the Uzbek Soviet Socialist Republic. Further bits and pieces of territory were transferred several times between Kazakhstan and Uzbekistan after World War II.

In 1937–38, during the Great Purge, a number of alleged nationalists were executed, including Faizullah Khojaev, the first prime minister.

During World War II, many industries were relocated to Uzbekistan from vulnerable locations in western regions of the USSR to keep them safe. Large numbers of Russians, Ukrainians and other nationalities accompanied the factories, altering the demographics of the republic. The demographics situation was further aggravated by Stalin's forced deportation of some ethnic groups suspected of collaboration with the Axis powers (including Nazi Germany) from other parts of the Soviet Union to Uzbekistan. This included large numbers of ethnic Koreans, Crimean Tatars, and Chechens.

During the Soviet period, Islam became a focal point for the anti-religious drives of Communist authorities. The government closed most mosques, and religious schools became anti-religious museums. On the positive side was the virtual elimination of illiteracy, even in rural areas. Only a small percentage of the population was literate before 1917; this percentage increased to nearly 100 percent under the Soviets.

Another major development, one with future catastrophic impact, was the drive initiated in the early 1960s to substantially increase cotton production in the republic. This drive led to overzealous irrigation withdrawals of irrigation water from the Amu Darya and the subsequent Aral Sea ecological disaster.

Towards the end of the Soviet–Afghan War, several troops crossed the Uzbek border from Afghanistan as part of the Soviet withdrawal on 15 February 1989. During the war Afghan mujahideen sponsored by the U.S. Central Intelligence Agency and the Pakistani Inter-Services Intelligence also crossed the border to commit sabotage operations. 

The Communist Party was the only legal party in the Uzbek SSR until 1990. The first secretary, or head, of the Communist Party of Uzbekistan was consistently an Uzbek. Long-time leader of the Uzbek SSR was Sharof Rashidov, head of the Communist Party of Uzbekistan from 1959 to 1983. Islam Karimov, leader of the Communist Party of Uzbekistan since 1989 and subsequently head of that party's reincarnation, the People's Democratic Party (PDP), became president of the Uzbek SSR in 1990. On 20 June 1990, the Supreme Soviet adopted the Declaration of State Sovereignty of the Uzbek SSR, which took over the laws of the Soviet Union days after the Russian SFSR adopted theirs.

Independence

The Uzbek SSR participated in the referendum in March 1991 as a part of the proposed Union of Soviet Sovereign States. This never came to pass after unsuccessful coup attempt events between 19 and 21 August 1991 in Moscow. In the aftermath, the Uzbek SSR was renamed the Republic of Uzbekistan and declared its independence on 31 August 1991, with the Soviet Union dissolving on 26 December 1991. After independence, the 1978 Constitution remained in use. The referendum was confirmed on 29 December 1991.

Politics

Uzbekistan, akin to the rest of the Soviet republics, was defined by a single-party socialist republic framework, whereby the First Secretary of the Central Committee was the head of the party, the Chairman of the Presidium of the Supreme Soviet as the head of state and the Chairmen of the Council of Ministers served as the head of government in a one-party system led by the CPSU's republican branch, the Communist Party of Uzbekistan. Executive power was exercised by the government and the legislative power was vested in Supreme Soviet where it met for sessions in Tashkent.

Military

Uzbekistan had the strongest Soviet Armed Forces presence of the other Central Asian Republics. Almost all of its troops were personnel of the Turkestan Military District (TurkVO), which was based in Tashkent. Personnel from the TurkVO were distributed between the military of Uzbekistan, as well as the militaries of the other four Central Asian republics when it was dissolved in June 1992. At independence, ethnic Russians filled the ranks of the newly created armed forces, and made up most of the officer corps.

The Uzbek SSR operated its own domestic Ministry of Internal Affairs (MVD) independent of the Ministry of Internal Affairs of the Soviet Union, of which it was a republican affiliate organization.

Economy

Uzbekistan had an industrial sector including electric power generation, engineering, and chemical production.

Uzbekistan's energy came from large thermal power plants, including those at Syrdarya, Angren, Tashkent and others. There was also a hydroelectric component to the economy, including the Charvak, Hodzhikentskaya, Gazalkent and Farkhad hydroelectric plants, among others.

The natural gas industry was of importance to the economy of the republic. The Gazly deposits and other and Kashkadarya (Mubarak, Shurtan) area contributed to this industry. Uzbekistan also produced oil (Fergana valley, Bukhara and Surkhandarya region). In terms of minerals, there was production of lead and zinc, tungsten, molybdenum, copper ores (found in the Karamazarskaya group of deposits), and gold (found in the Navoi region, Jizzakh region, and others).

Chemical manufacturing included the production of mineral fertilizers (nitrogen and phosphorus) for cotton (in Chirchik, Kokand, Samarkand, Fergana, Almalyk, and Navoi); the manufacture of chemical fibers (in Fergana); plastics (in Fergana and Namangan), rubber products, household chemicals, and more. Petrochemical, chemical and pharmaceutical, and the microbiological industry were all present in some form.

Some of the engineering sector included: agriculture (machinery for the mechanization of cotton cultivation, cotton harvesters, etc.), production of tractors, equipment for the cotton and textile industry, construction and road machines, electrical engineering; aviation, electronic and instrument-making, chemical and petroleum engineering. Some companies also produced cement, asbestos-cement pipes, slate, and ceramics.

Some of the light industry present in Uzbekistan included the primary processing of cotton, silk cocoons, wool, fiber crops, raw hides, and karakul pelts. Cotton and silk textiles, footwear, garments, and carpets were all produced in Uzbekistan.

The food industry produced oil and fat - mainly oil production from cotton seeds, tinned vegetables, butter and cheese, milk, and meat.

Subdivisions

List of changes
27 October 1924 – creation of Uzbek Soviet Socialist Republic
15 October 1929 – Tajik Autonomous Soviet Socialist Republic and a region around Khujand/Khodzhent split off and become the Tajik Soviet Socialist Republic
5 December 1936 – Karakalpak Autonomous Soviet Socialist Republic was joined to the Uzbek SSR
16 February 1963 – Syr Darya Oblast (center: Gulistan) is formed.  "In 1973 a large part of the oblast’s territory was transferred to the newly formed Dzhizak Oblast"
29 December 1973 – Dzhizak Oblast split from Samarkand Oblast, Ru WP: Dzhizak is formed
ca. 1981 – Navoiy Oblast split from Bukhara Oblast
20 April 1982 – Ru WP Navoiy Oblast is formed

1927

 Khorezm Okrug (cap: Khiva)
 Kanimekh Raion (cap.: Kanimekh)
 Bukhara
 Zeravshan Okrug (cap: Kermine)
 Kashka-Darin Okrug (cap: Bek-Budi)
 Samarkand
 Surkhan-Darshin Okrug (cap: Shirabad)
 Tashkent
 Khotshent
 Fergan Okrug (capital: Kokand)
 Andizhan
 Tajik ASSR
 Dushanbe
 Gorno-Badakhshan Autonomous Oblast (cap:Khoror)

1936
Constitution of the USSR:

1938

 Karakalpak Autonomous Soviet Socialist Republic (Nukus)
 Khorezm Oblast (cap: Urgench)
 Bukhara Oblast (today: Bukhara Region)
 Surkhan-Daryhin Okrug (today: Surxondaryo Region)
 Samarkand Oblast (today: Samarkand Region, Jizzakh Region, Sirdaryo Region)
 Tashkent Oblast (today: Toshkent Region)
 Fergana Oblast (capital: Fergana, today: Namangan Region, Andijan Region, Fergana Region)

1989

Karakalpak ASSR
Khorezm Oblast
Bukhara Oblast
Samarkand Oblast
Kashkadarya Oblast
Surkhadarya Oblast
Jizzakh Oblast
Syrdarya Oblast
Tashkent Oblast
Andijan Oblast
Namangan Oblast
Fergana Oblast

1991

References

External links 
Uzbekistan; Another Big Leap Forward by Afif Alimov

 
Republics of the Soviet Union
Communism in Uzbekistan
Former socialist republics
States and territories established in 1924
States and territories disestablished in 1991
1924 establishments in the Soviet Union
1991 disestablishments in the Soviet Union